Lee Raymond Dice (July 15, 1887 – January 31, 1977) was an American ecologist and geneticist who taught at the University of Michigan for almost his entire career. He taught at the University of Michigan for 38 years in total, during which time he founded the University's heredity clinic and served as director of its Institute of Human Biology. He served as president of the Ecological Society of America from 1952 to 1953 and received its Eminent Ecologist Award in 1964.

He is known for independently developing the Sørensen–Dice coefficient.

References

1887 births
1977 deaths
People from Savannah, Georgia
American ecologists
American geneticists
University of Michigan faculty
Stanford University alumni
University of California, Berkeley alumni